Panagiotis Adamidis (born 2 September 1977) is a Greek swimmer. He competed in the men's 100 metre backstroke and men's 200 metre backstroke events at the 1996 Summer Olympics.

References

External links
 

1977 births
Living people
Swimmers at the 1996 Summer Olympics
Greek male backstroke swimmers
Olympic swimmers of Greece